Augustus Adolphus St John Nepean (24 June 1849 – 24 January 1933) was an English first-class cricketer active 1876–77 who played for Middlesex and Marylebone Cricket Club (MCC). He was born and died in Westminster.

References

1849 births
1933 deaths
English cricketers
Middlesex cricketers
Marylebone Cricket Club cricketers
Jenner family (Wales)